James Dalvin Cook (born September 25, 1999) is an American football running back for the Buffalo Bills of the National Football League (NFL). He played college football at Georgia.

Early life and high school
Cook grew up in Miami, Florida, and attended Miami Central Senior High School. He rushed for 709 yards and eight touchdowns on 99 carries as a freshman. After his freshman year, Cook took extra courses and reclassified from a sophomore to a junior. As a senior, he rushed for 782 yards and 10 touchdowns on 91 carries. Cook rushed for 2,019 yards and 30 touchdowns during his high school career.

Cook was a highly rated recruit and initially committed to play college football at Florida State, where his brother was playing, after his freshman year of high school. He later decommitted during the summer before his senior year. Cook later signed a letter of intent to play at Georgia after considering offers from Louisville and Florida. Cook transferred to Miami Northwestern Senior High School after his senior football season for his final semester of high school.

College career
Cook played in 13 games as a freshman and gained 284 yards and scored two touchdowns on 41 carries with eight receptions for 89 yards. He played in all 14 of Georgia's games and rushed 31 times for 188 yards and two touchdowns while also catching 16 passes for 132 yards in his sophomore season. In 2020, Cook was the team's second-leading rusher with 303 yards and three touchdowns on 45 carries and caught 16 passes for 225 yards and two touchdowns. Cook missed the 2021 Peach Bowl following the death of his father.

Cook rushed for 728 yards and seven touchdowns and caught 27 passes for 284 yards and four touchdowns as a senior as the Bulldogs won the 2022 College Football Playoff National Championship. He was the leading receiver for Georgia with 112 yards and one touchdown on four receptions in the team's 34-11 win over Michigan in the Orange Bowl semifinal game. After the end of the season, Cook declared that he would be entering the 2022 NFL Draft.

Professional career

Cook was drafted by the Buffalo Bills in the second round, 63rd overall, in the 2022 NFL Draft. In Week 5, against the Pittsburgh Steelers, Cook scored his first professional touchdown on a 24-yard rush in the 38–3 victory.

NFL career statistics

Regular season

Postseason

Personal life
Cook is the younger brother of fellow running back Dalvin Cook.

References

External links
 Buffalo Bills bio
Georgia Bulldogs bio

Living people
American football running backs
Georgia Bulldogs football players
Players of American football from Miami
1999 births
Buffalo Bills players